First Encounter - Last Encounter is a 1987 Soviet detective film directed by Vitaliy Melnikov.

Plot 
The film is about a law student, Pete, who is investigating the murder of one inventor and comes to the conclusion that the German Scholz is to blame for this, as well as that he is not engaged in his own business.

Cast 
 Mikhail Morozov as Chukhontsev
 Grazyna Szapolowska as Wanda
 Oleg Efremov as Zanzeveev, an inventor
 Boris Plotnikov as Kuklin, an inventor
 Yuriy Bogatyryov as Major Gei
 Sergey Shakurov as Scholtz
 Mikhail Kononov as Former detective
 Nikolay Kryuchkov as Policeman
 Innokenty Smoktunovsky as Member of counter-intelligence
 Leonid Kuravlyov as Count

References

External links 
 

1987 films
1980s Russian-language films
Soviet detective films